John David Hardiker (born 7 July 1982) is an English former professional footballer.

Hardiker was a product of the academy system at Morecambe where he made his first full appearance at the age of 16. He moved in 2002 for a fee of £150,000 to Stockport County where he famously scored two goals in a historic victory over Manchester City. After making over 100 appearances for Stockport he moved to Bury before returning to Morecambe.

Hardiker was then released by Morecambe and spent some time at Fleetwood Town before being snapped up by Jim Harvey by signing a contract at Forest Green Rovers.

He had a turbulent 2008–09 season with Forest Green. He was appointed club captain  until being sidelined for 4 months with injury, after which he made a dramatic return scoring twice in a 3–0 win over Northwich. Shortly after this, in late February 2009 he was suspended by the club over a non-club related matter. In March 2009 Hardiker resigned from his contract with Forest Green following his suspension.

On 19 March 2009 it was announced that Hardiker has signed a contract with Conference North side Stalybridge Celtic. In late 2010 he joined Droylsden after the two teams agreed an undisclosed fee.

In January 2012, Hardiker left Droylsden and signed for Radcliffe Borough.

In May 2012 he signed for Northwich Victoria. He left Northwich in December 2012 however and he joined Warrington Town. Because of postponements over the 2012 festive period, Hardiker failed to make a single appearance for Warrington and left the club to sign for Connah's Quay Nomads in January 2013. He left the Welsh club at the end of the season and in August 2013 joined Ashton United. After a season at Ashton, he moved to Lancaster City in June 2014.

In October 2018 he signed for Scottish Junior football club Newburgh Juniors.

Notes and references

External links

1982 births
Living people
Footballers from Preston, Lancashire
English footballers
Association football defenders
Morecambe F.C. players
Stockport County F.C. players
Bury F.C. players
Fleetwood Town F.C. players
Forest Green Rovers F.C. players
Stalybridge Celtic F.C. players
Droylsden F.C. players
Radcliffe F.C. players
Northwich Victoria F.C. players
Warrington Town F.C. players
Connah's Quay Nomads F.C. players
Ashton United F.C. players
Lancaster City F.C. players
Northern Premier League players
National League (English football) players
English Football League players